The Penguin World Omnibus of Science Fiction is an anthology edited by Brian W. Aldiss and Sam J. Lundwall published in 1986.

Plot summary
The Penguin World Omnibus of Science Fiction is an anthology which offers representative stories from 26 countries.

Reception
Dave Langford reviewed The Penguin World Omnibus of Science Fiction for White Dwarf #82, and stated that "It's oddly like an historical collection: a language's SF moves further from the Wellsian tale of wonder as sophistication and schlock accumulate, and for all the skills of the English speakers here, the more "isolated" authors can be closer to the wellsprings."

Reviews
Review by Jon Wallace (1954 -) (1986) in Vector 135
Review by Darrell Schweitzer (1987) in Aboriginal Science Fiction, November-December 1987

References

1986 novels